Goldsmid is a German surname. Notable people with the name include:

Surname

Goldsmid
 Albert Goldsmid (1846–1904), British officer, founder of the Jewish Lads' Brigade (in 1895) and the Maccabaeans
 Anna Maria Goldsmid (1805–1889), British benefactor and translator
 Francis Goldsmid (1808–1878), Anglo-Jewish barrister and politician
 Frederic John Goldsmid (1818–1908), officer in the British Army and the East India Company, also served the British government
 Frederick Goldsmid (1812–1866), Anglo-Jewish politician
 Isaac Goldsmid (1778–1859), British financier and one of the leading figures in the Jewish emancipation in the United Kingdom
 Julian Goldsmid (1838–1896), British lawyer, businessman and Liberal (later Liberal Unionist) politician
 Louisa Goldsmid (1819–1908), British philanthropist and education activist

Modified surname 
 d'Avigdor-Goldsmid
 Henry d'Avigdor-Goldsmid (1909–1976), British army officer, company director and politician
 Jack d'Avigdor-Goldsmid (1912–1987), British Army officer and British Conservative politician
 Osmond d'Avigdor-Goldsmid (1877–1940), British Baronet who served as High Sheriff of Kent in 1912, President of the Anglo-Jewish Association

 Goldsmid-Stern-Salomons
 David Lionel Goldsmid-Stern-Salomons

Variation on surname 
 Goldschmid
 Goldschmidt
 Goldschmied
 Goldschmitt
 Goldsmith
 Aurifaber

See also

 Goldsmid family
 Goldsmid baronets
 D'Avigdor-Goldsmid baronets
 Goldsmid-Stern-Salomons baronets

German-language surnames
Jewish surnames